Club Baloncesto Atapuerca, more commonly known as (Autocid) Ford Burgos by sponsorship reasons, was a professional basketball team based in Burgos, Castilla y León and played in the Polideportivo El Plantío, in LEB Gold league.

History

The club born as CD Maristas  started to play in lower division with that team. CD Maristas reached the Liga EBA in the 98–99 season and competed in that league during three years. In 2001, the club became independent of the Liceo Castilla school and gets the name of CB Atapuerca, more recently becoming known as Autocid Ford Burgos for sponsorship reasons.

In 2002, because of the renounces of other teams, the club reaches the LEB Plata, called LEB–2 that year, and after a first bad year, CB Atapuerca grows and tries to promote to LEB Oro. After two semifinals where they were defeated, in the third play–off they are champions after a double 3–0 (CB Vic in quarterfinals and Ourense in semifinals) and a winning in the final of the league against Gandía.

Since 2006, CB Atapuerca competes in LEB Oro. In 2008–09 season, with Andreu Casadevall as coach, the club reaches the play–off for first time and they lose 2–1 with Alicante Costablanca.

In the 2009–10 season, after finishing the regular season in the fifth position, the reach they play–off finals after winning 3–1 in quarterfinals against Cáceres 2016 and in semifinals against Melilla Baloncesto. In a thrilling series, they lost 3–2 against ViveMenorca, team who finally promoted to Liga ACB.

One year later, Ford Burgos finishes in the third position of the regular season and reaches again the promotion finals, after beating 3–1 to Grupo Iruña Navarra and 3–0 to Girona FC. In the finals, the team losses against Blu:sens Monbús.

In 2012, Ford Burgos played for the first time the Copa Príncipe de Asturias, but was defeated 93–85 by Iberostar Canarias in a game played in San Cristóbal de La Laguna. The team finally won this trophy in the next season, after beating River Andorra in Burgos by 73–67.

On 19 May 2013 the club finished the 2012–13 as champion and consequently promoted to Liga ACB for the first time in its history, but is not accepted in the league due to not paying the entering quota in the Association.

After this setback, CB Atapuerca was replaced and a new society called CB Tizona, remembering the former CB Espada Tizona, which played in the second division in the 1970s and the 1980s, was created with the aim to make easier a future promotion to ACB.

The club is not dissolved and it currently plays in the provincial league of Burgos.

Retired numbers
8 Tony Smith, PG, 2003–2007

Season by season

Honors

Trophies
LEB Oro (1):
2013
Copa Príncipe de Asturias (1):
2013
LEB Plata (1):
2006
LEB Plata Cup: (2)
2005, 2006
Copa Castilla y León: (1)
2008

Individual awards
All LEB Oro First Team
Micah Downs – 2011

Notable players
 Diego García
 Diego Lo Grippo
 Leo Mainoldi
 Marcus Vinicius Toledo
 Jeff Xavier
 Carles Marco
 Alberto Miguel
 Darren Phillip
 Péter Lóránt
 Micah Downs
 Zach Morley
 Luke Sikma

References

External links
Federación Española de Baloncesto
Ford Burgos Official Page

Basketball teams established in 1997
Basketball teams in Castile and León
Former LEB Oro teams
Former LEB Plata teams
Former Liga EBA teams
Sport in Burgos
1997 establishments in Spain